Compsosomatini is a tribe of longhorn beetles of the subfamily Lamiinae.

Taxonomy
 Aerenea
 Antennaerenea
 Brasiliosoma
 Compsosoma
 Cristaerenea
 Desmiphoropsis
 Eusphaerium
 Laraesima
 Paracompsosoma
 Parapythais
 Pythais
 Tessarecphora
 Tucales

References

 
Lamiinae